The Oenus (Ancient Greek: ,  - Oinountas, also called Kelefina) is a river in the Peloponnese peninsula, southern Greece. It rises in the watershed of Mt. Parnon, and, after flowing in a general southwesterly direction, falls into the Eurotas, at the distance of little more than a mile from Sparta. (Polyb. ii. 65, 66; Liv. xxxiv. 28.) The principal tributary of the Oenus was the Gorgylus (Greek: Γόργυλος, Polyb. ii. 66), probably the river of Vrestená. (Leake, Peloponnesiaca, p. 347.) The municipal unit Oinountas, part of the municipality Sparta, was named after the river Oenus.

References

Landforms of Laconia
Rivers of Greece
Rivers of Peloponnese (region)
1Oenus